Wila Jamach'ini (Aymara wila blood, blood-red, jamach'i bird,  -ni a suffix to indicate ownership, "the red one with a bird (or birds)" or "the one with a red bird (or birds)", also spelled Wila Jamachini) is a mountain in the Bolivian Andes, about  high. It is situated in the La Paz Department, Murillo Province, La Paz Municipality. Wila Jamach'ini lies north-east of the mountain Llamp'u of the Cordillera Real.

References 

Mountains of La Paz Department (Bolivia)